Dr. C. L. Gerling House is a historic home located at Augusta, St. Charles County, Missouri. It was built about 1850, and is a -story, half-timber frame dwelling sheathed in weatherboard.  The house measures approximately 27 feet wide and 35 feet deep.  It has a side gable roof and sits on a stone foundation.

It was added to the National Register of Historic Places in 1995.

References

Houses on the National Register of Historic Places in Missouri
Houses completed in 1850
Buildings and structures in St. Charles County, Missouri
National Register of Historic Places in St. Charles County, Missouri